The geology of Oklahoma is characterized by Carboniferous rocks in the east, Permian rocks in the center and towards the west, and a cover of Tertiary deposits in the panhandle to the west. The panhandle of Oklahoma is also noted for its Jurassic rocks as well.  Cretaceous sediments are found in the south east. There are also some areas with older outcrops dating back to Cambrian, and even one area of Precambrian igneous rocks.

See also
2011 Oklahoma earthquake
2016 Oklahoma earthquake
Oklahoma earthquake swarms (2009–present)
Oklahoma Geological Survey

Sources
Oklahoma Geological Survey

U.S. Geological Survey

Oklahoma - Digital Geologic Map Database http://pubs.usgs.gov/of/2003/ofr-03-247/OK_map.pdf (19 MB).

 
Oklahoma
Natural history of Oklahoma